Giacomo Pastorino (born 7 June 1980) is an Italian water polo goalkeeper. At the 2012 Summer Olympics, he competed for the Italy men's national water polo team in the men's event, winning the silver medal. He is 6 ft 3 inches tall.

See also
 Italy men's Olympic water polo team records and statistics
 List of Olympic medalists in water polo (men)
 List of men's Olympic water polo tournament goalkeepers
 List of world champions in men's water polo
 List of World Aquatics Championships medalists in water polo

References

External links
 

1980 births
Living people
People from Savona
Italian male water polo players
Water polo goalkeepers
Water polo players at the 2012 Summer Olympics
Medalists at the 2012 Summer Olympics
Olympic silver medalists for Italy in water polo
World Aquatics Championships medalists in water polo
Sportspeople from the Province of Savona